Buck Sexton  is an American radio host and television talk show host, author, and conservative political commentator. He is the co-host with Clay Travis of The Clay Travis and Buck Sexton Show, a nationally syndicated talk radio show, and host of Hold the Line, a weeknight program on The First TV.

Early life 
Sexton was born in Manhattan, New York, on December 28, 1981, to Jane Buckman Hickey and Mason Speed Sexton, a Wall Street financier.  Buck attended Saint David's School before earning a bachelor's degree in political science from Amherst College.

Career 
Sexton is a former Central Intelligence Agency officer first joining as an analyst in 2005. His assignments included the Al Qaeda-focused Counterterrorism Center (CTC) and the Office of Iraqi Analysis.

In 2011, he joined TheBlaze as a national security editor and later worked as a contributor. He eventually became a permanent anchor there. Sexton has filled in for Rush Limbaugh, Sean Hannity, and Glenn Beck.

In 2012, his book, Occupy: American Spring - The Making of a Revolution, regarding the Occupy Wall Street movement was published under .

The Clay Travis and Buck Sexton Show 
On June 21, 2021, Sexton began co-hosting the syndicated conservative talk radio program The Clay Travis and Buck Sexton Show alongside sports journalist Clay Travis, with Sexton moving from an evening show he hosted for Premiere Networks. The program is billed as a successor to The Rush Limbaugh Show, replacing Rush Limbaugh's time slot after his death earlier in the year.

References 

1981 births
Living people
American conservative talk radio hosts
People from Manhattan
Amherst College alumni
People of the Central Intelligence Agency